Tomoxia ryukyuana is a species of beetle in the genus Tomoxia of the family Mordellidae. It was described by Takakuwa in 1985.

References

Beetles described in 1985
Tomoxia